E. A. Jabbar (Malayalam: ഇ. എ. ജബ്ബാർ) is an Indian atheist, humanist, rationalist, speaker and writer from Kerala. He is best known as a critic of Quran and Islam. He is an active member of several rationalist organizations. He was the Vice-president of Kerala Yukthivadi Sangham and its Malappuram district secretary for a considerable duration. He was also an editorial board member of the monthly magazine, Yukthirekha, the official journal of the Kerala Yukthivadi Sangham.
He was a member of Kerala State Teachers' Association  (KSTA), which is the teacher's wing of the political party CPI(M). He started his career as a government school teacher, and retired from service, after which carried on with his activism for free-thought and atheism.

Early life and career
Jabbar was born into an orthodox Muslim family in Malappuram in Kerala, India but gave up his faith in Islam while studying in the tenth grade after reading the Malayalam translation of Quran. He felt it had many inconsistencies and contradictions, and he did not get satisfactory answers to his questions from his family circle l. When rationalist Joseph Edamaruku published his book Quran: A Critical Study (Original title: Quran Oru Vimarsana Padanam) in early 1980, it was subject to widespread discussion, and Jabbar actively took part in many of these debates. Gradually, he became part of the debating circles representing the rationalists.

He began his career as a school teacher and later turned into an orator in Kerala. He gathered more fame from his candid blogging and videos in social media and across the "free thinkers" communities in Kerala. He is also known for his videos and podcasts that criticize Islam. He has done some controversial debates with Islamic scholars in Kerala like M M Akbar, which have viewership by the thousands in social media.

Debate with M. M. Akbar

Challenge 

On 9 January 2021, E. A. Jabbar and popular Islamic scholar and the director at Niche of Truth, M. M. Akbar debated on the topic, whether Quran is scientific or not.  A rationalist organisation―Kerala Yukthivadi Sangham―arranged the venue and stage to have this debate.

In contrast, both sides claimed victory in the debate, and the video of the debate which went viral was re-used with footage from the original video to prove the success of either side. Not to mention that the video that appeared on M. M. Akbar's YouTube account proclaimed his victory over Jabbar in the debate.

The flip side of the program was that M. M. Akbar was criticized for stating that the Quran is scientific with his version of understanding the text. His opponents said that he had reduced the Quran to a mere science book.

Philanthropy 
During the COVID-19 pandemic, EA Jabbar contributed all his income from his YouTube channel—around Rs50,000—to the Kerala Chief Minister's Distress Relief Fund (CMDRF).

References

External links
 E. A. Jabbar Blogs

Living people
Indian atheism activists
Indian rationalists
Indian materialists
Indian religious sceptics
Indian sceptics
21st-century Indian philosophers
Indian male writers
Writers from Kerala
1956 births